The 2012 Internationaux de Nouvelle-Calédonie was a professional tennis tournament played on hard courts. It was the ninth edition of the tournament which is part of the 2012 ATP Challenger Tour. It took place in Nouméa, New Caledonia between 2 and 8 January 2011.

Singles main-draw entrants

Seeds

 1 Rankings are as of December 26, 2012.

Other entrants
The following players received wildcards into the singles main draw:
  Axel Michon
  Nicolas N'Godrela
  Ludovic Walter

The following players received entry from the qualifying draw:
  Matthew Barton
  Loic Perret
  Peter Polansky
  Eric Scherer

Champions

Singles

 Jérémy Chardy def.  Adrián Menéndez, 6–4, 6–3

Doubles

 Sanchai Ratiwatana /  Sonchat Ratiwatana def.  Axel Michon /  Guillaume Rufin, 6–0, 6–4

External links
Official Website
ITF Search
ATP official site

Internationaux de Nouvelle-Caledonie
Internationaux de Nouvelle-Calédonie
Inter
2012 in French tennis